The genus Mus or typical mice refers to a specific genus of muroid rodents, all typically called mice (the adjective "muroid" comes from the word "Muroidea", which is a large superfamily of rodents, including mice, rats, voles, hamsters, gerbils, and many other relatives). They are the only members of the tribe Murini. However, the term mouse can also be applied to species outside of this genus.

Subgenera, species, and subspecies
[[File:Mouse vermin02.jpg|thumb|250px|Mouse of the subgenus Mus.]]
The following is a list of Mus subgenera, species, and subspecies:
Coelomys
Mus crociduroides (Sumatran shrewlike mouse) 
Mus mayori (Mayor's mouse) 
Mus pahari (Gairdner's shrewmouse)
Mus vulcani (volcano mouse)
Mus
Mus booduga (Little Indian field mouse)
Mus caroli (Ryukyu mouse)
Mus cervicolor (Fawn-colored mouse) 
Mus cervicolor cervicolor
Mus cervicolor popaeus
Mus cookii (Cook's mouse)
Mus cypriacus (Cyprus mouse) 
Mus famulus (Servant mouse)
Mus fragilicauda (sheath-tailed mouse)
Mus lepidoides (little Burmese field mouse)
Mus macedonicus (Macedonian mouse) 
Mus macedonicus macedonicus
Mus macedonicus spretoides
Mus musculus (House mouse) 
Mus musculus albula
Mus musculus bactrianus (Southwestern Asian house mouse)
Mus musculus brevirostris
Mus musculus castaneus (Southeastern Asian house mouse)
Mus musculus domesticus (Western European house mouse)
Mus musculus gansuensis
Mus musculus gentilulus (Pygmy house mouse)
Mus musculus helgolandicus
Mus musculus homourus
Mus musculus isatissus
Mus musculus molossinus (Japanese house mouse)
Mus musculus musculus (Eastern European house mouse)
Mus musculus wagneri
Mus nitidulus (Blyth's mouse)
Mus spicilegus (Steppe mouse) 
Mus spretus (Western wild mouse)
Mus terricolor (Earth-colored mouse)
Mus triton (Gray-bellied mouse)
Muriculus
Mus imberbis (Ethiopian striped mouse)
Nannomys
Mus baoulei (Baoule's mouse)
Mus bufo (Toad mouse)
Mus callewaerti (Callewaert's mouse)
Mus goundae (Gounda mouse)
Mus haussa (Hausa mouse)
Mus indutus (Desert pygmy mouse)
Mus mahomet (Mahomet mouse)
Mus mattheyi (Matthey's mouse)
Mus minutoides (Southern African pygmy mouse)
Mus musculoides (Temminck's mouse)
Mus neavei (Neave's mouse)
Mus oubanguii (Ubangui mouse)
Mus setulosus (Peters's mouse)
Mus setzeri (Setzer's mouse)
Mus sorella (Thomas's pygmy mouse)
Mus tenellus (Delicate mouse)
Pyromys
Mus fernandoni (Ceylon spiny mouse)
Mus phillipsi (Phillips's mouse)
Mus platythrix (Flat-haired mouse)
Mus saxicola (Spiny mouse)
Mus shortridgei (Shortridge's mouse)

Mice and human health 
Mice are part of human experimentation. Many of the tests are related to new products that are launched on the market, but they are also required to try new medicines for the cure of chronic and deadly human diseases.

After the outbreak of H5N1 influenza in China in 2006, US scientists discovered that under training, mice could detect carrier birds with this virus, so they would prevent a massive contagion or threat of an epidemic.

References

!
Rodent genera
Taxa named by Carl Alexander Clerck
Mice
Messinian genera
Zanclean genera
Piacenzian genera
Gelasian genera
Calabrian genera
Ionian genera
Tarantian genera
Holocene genera